Rankers are soils developed over non-calcareous material, usually rock.  They are regarded in some soil classifications as lithomorphic soils, a group which also includes rendzinas, similar soils over calcareous material.  They are often called A/C soils, as the topsoil or A horizon is immediately over a C horizon (unaltered parent material).

References

Pedology
Types of soil